Hadlee is a surname. Notable people with the surname include:

Barry Hadlee (born 1941), played two One Day Cricket Internationals for New Zealand
Dayle Hadlee (born 1948), former New Zealand cricketer who played in 26 Tests and 11 ODIs from 1969 to 1978
Richard Hadlee, MBE (born 1951), former New Zealand cricketer who played provincial cricket for Canterbury, Nottinghamshire and Tasmania
Walter Hadlee (1915–2006), New Zealand cricketer and Test match captain

See also
Chappell–Hadlee Trophy in cricket is an annual ODI series between Australia and New Zealand

de:Hadlee